Marc Henry Dalton (born 1965) is a retired United States Navy rear admiral who last served as the Director of Assessment of the U.S. Navy. Previously, he was Director of Maritime Operations for the United States Pacific Fleet.

Born in California, Dalton is a 1987 graduate of the United States Naval Academy with a Bachelor of Science degree in systems engineering. He later earned a Master of Public Administration degree from the Kennedy School at Harvard University.

References

|-

1965 births
Living people
People from Los Angeles County, California
United States Naval Academy alumni
Harvard Kennedy School alumni
Recipients of the Meritorious Service Medal (United States)
Recipients of the Legion of Merit
United States Navy admirals
Recipients of the Defense Superior Service Medal